Deh-e Mansur (also Romanized as Deh-e Manṣūr; also known as Dehmanṣūr) is a village in Dehdasht-e Sharqi Rural District, in the Central District of Kohgiluyeh County, Kohgiluyeh and Boyer-Ahmad Province, Iran. At the 2006 census, its population was 62, in 11 families.

References 

Populated places in Kohgiluyeh County